John Gavin (or John Gaven) (1829 – 6 April 1844) was the first European settler to be legally executed in Western Australia. He was executed for murder at the age of fifteen.

Life
Born in 1829, Gavin was convicted of an offence while still a juvenile, and was transported to Western Australia as a Parkhurst apprentice, arriving on board Shepherd in October 1843.

On 3 April 1844, he was tried for the murder of his employer's son, 18-year-old George Pollard. He confessed to killing the sleeping victim with an adze, but he seemed unaware of a rational motive. Three days later he was publicly hanged outside the Round House in Fremantle. After a death mask had been taken and his brain studied for "scientific purposes" he was buried in the sand hills to the south without a ceremony.

References

1829 births
1844 deaths
Convicts transported to Western Australia
Executed children
Executed Australian people
People executed for murder
People executed by Western Australia
Australian people convicted of murder
Australian murderers of children
People convicted of murder by Western Australia
People executed by Australian colonies by hanging